Eupithecia mortua is a moth in the family Geometridae first described by András Mátyás Vojnits in 1984. It is found in China.

References

Moths described in 1984
mortua
Moths of Asia